Operation Oganj '92 was a military action conducted on the 7th October 1992 by the 505th Bužim Brigade then called the 105. Bužim-Krajina Brigade. The goal of the Operation was to push back the Serb forces who were standing on the outskirts of Bužim and liberate the occupied elevation of Čorkovač.

The Operation 
In this Operation the 505th Bužim Brigade liberated Čorkovača, taking control of part of the state border. The Operation was carried out by ČSN HAMZA and a company of the second battalion of the 105th Buzim Brigade with the APAČE detachment from the 111th Bosanska Krupa Brigade. This battle confirmed the strategic genius of the young general Izet Nanić, it was the first offensive action of the 505th Bužim Brigade.

Aftermath 
In the area of Ćorkovača about twenty km2 of territory was liberated, a significant amount of weapons and ammunition was captured, and several dozen enemy soldiers were liquidated. With this conquest, they were achieved significantly more favorably conditions for planning a wider action to liberate state territory in the direction of the north and east. Frontal attack was no longer the only option. They liberated the state border from Culumka to Corkovac in a length of 10 km (never lost until the end of the war)

References 

Bosnian War
Corps of the Army of the Republic of Bosnia and Herzegovina
Army of Republika Srpska